Bina Thermal Power Plant is a coal based thermal power project located at Bina Etawa in Sagar district in Indian state of Madhya Pradesh. The power plant is one of the coal based power plants of Jaypee Group. Current talks of this power plant being sold to Jindal owned JSW Energy are under progress.

Capacity
Its installed capacity is 500 MW (2x250 MW).

References

Coal-fired power stations in Madhya Pradesh
Sagar district
Energy infrastructure completed in 2012
2012 establishments in Madhya Pradesh